

Paul Freiherr von Hauser (24 April 1911 – 1 April 1999) was an officer in the Wehrmacht during World War II who commanded the Panzer Lehr Division. He was a recipient of the Knight's Cross of the Iron Cross with Oak Leaves of Nazi Germany. Oberst (colonel) Hauser surrendered the division to the American forces in the Ruhr Pocket on April 15, 1945.

Awards and decorations
 Iron Cross (1939) 2nd Class (3 November 1939) & 1st Class (1 August 1940)

 Honour Roll Clasp of the Army (5 October 1942)
 German Cross in Gold on 20 September 1942 as Hauptmann in Kradschützen-Battalion 61
 Knight's Cross of the Iron Cross with Oak Leaves
 Knight's Cross on 25 January 1943 as Hauptmann and commander of Kradschützen-Battalion 61
 635th Oak Leaves on 28 October 1944 as Oberstleutnant and commander of Panzergrenadier-Lehr-Regiment 901

References

Citations

Bibliography

 
 
 
 

1911 births
1999 deaths
Military personnel from Graz
Barons of Austria
Austrian military personnel of World War II
Recipients of the Gold German Cross
Recipients of the Knight's Cross of the Iron Cross with Oak Leaves
World War II prisoners of war held by the United States
Austrian prisoners of war